Apurva Kasaravalli or Apoorva Kasaravalli is an Indian businessman, actor and filmmaker known for his work in Kannada cinema.

Personal life
Apurva is the son of Girish Kasaravalli and Vaishali Kasaravalli, and brother of Ananya Kasaravalli. He studied at Christ University and did his master's degree from University of Technology, Sydney, Australia. He is married to Vandana Supriya, who is an Odissi performer and choreographer.

Apurva and Vandana run an NGO called "Anandi Arts Foundation" that works with children from underprivileged backgrounds. They also organise an yearly event called  ′Asmi′  at Ravindra Kalakshetra, in which renowned musicians and dancers perform.

Selected filmography

References

External links

21st-century Indian film directors
Year of birth missing (living people)
Living people
Male actors in Kannada cinema
Christ University alumni
University of Technology Sydney alumni